The first USS Pioneer was most likely a barque in the United States Navy, although some reports classify her a frigate and others as a brig.

Pioneer was built in 1836 at the Norfolk Naval Shipyard. Commanded by Josiah Tattnall III, she carried General Santa Anna to Veracruz from Washington, D.C. in 1837. She most likely left service in 1844.

References
 
 Ship builder's records 

Barques of the United States Navy